Dawn Noelle Ison (born 1963) is an American lawyer who is the  United States Attorney for the Eastern District of Michigan.

Education 
Ison earned a Bachelor of Arts from Spelman College and a Juris Doctor from the Wayne State University Law School.

Career 
In 1989 and 1990, Ison was a prehearing attorney for the Michigan Court of Appeals. In 2002, Ison began serving as an Assistant United States Attorney in the United States Attorney's Office for the Eastern District of Michigan. She also served as chief of the Drug Enforcement Task Force Unit.

United States attorney for the Eastern District of Michigan 
On November 12, 2021, President Biden nominated Ison to be the United States Attorney for the Eastern District of Michigan. She was reported out favorably by the Senate Judiciary Committee on December 9, 2021, and was confirmed by the Senate on December 14, 2021. She was sworn into office on December 21, 2021.

References 

1963 births
Living people
20th-century American women lawyers
20th-century American lawyers
21st-century American women lawyers
21st-century American lawyers
African-American lawyers
African-American women lawyers
Assistant United States Attorneys
Lawyers from Detroit
Spelman College alumni
United States Attorneys for the Eastern District of Michigan
Wayne State University Law School alumni